Cell death activator CIDE-A is a protein that in humans is encoded by the CIDEA gene. Cidea is an essential transcriptional coactivator regulating mammary gland secretion of milk lipids.

This gene encodes the homolog of the mouse protein Cidea that has been shown to activate apoptosis. This activation of apoptosis is inhibited by the DNA fragmentation factor DFF45 but not by caspase inhibitors. Mice that lack functional Cidea have higher metabolic rates, higher lipolysis in brown adipose tissue and higher core body temperatures when subjected to cold. These mice are also resistant to diet-induced obesity and diabetes. This suggests that in mice this gene product plays a role in thermogenesis and lipolysis. Two alternative transcripts encoding different isoforms have been identified.

References

External links

Further reading